Kiss of a Killer is a 1993 American made-for-television thriller-drama film written by David  Warfield and directed by Larry Elikann. It stars Annette O'Toole, Eva Marie Saint and Brian Wimmer. The film debuted on February 1, 1993 on ABC.

Plot
Kate Wilson (Annette O'Toole), leads a double life by spending her days working in a real estate office and her nights caring for her ailing, manipulative mother (Eva Marie Saint). Once a week she tells her mother that she is staying with her friend Reba, when she is actually driving across town to stay at the Red Oak Inn, a local hotel resort which is her "escape". One of her encounters at the Red Oak Inn brings her into close contact with a serial rapist who has just stepped up to homicide.

Cast
 Annette O'Toole as Kate Wilson
 Eva Marie Saint as Mrs. Wilson
 Brian Wimmer as Gary Grafton
 Vic Polizos as Detective James
 Gregg Henry as Richard
 Lee Garlington as Helaine
 Gordon Clapp as Sullivan

References

External links

1993 television films
1993 films
1990s thriller drama films
American thriller drama films
ABC Motion Pictures films
Films directed by Larry Elikann
American thriller television films
American drama television films
1990s English-language films
1990s American films